Aeshna affinis, the southern migrant hawker or blue-eyed hawker, is a dragonfly found in southern Europe and Asia. It is in the family Aeshnidae and is very similar in appearance to A. mixta.

Identification

Aeshna affinis is a small Aeshna and very similar to the related A. mixta with which it is easily confused. As its name suggests the male has blue eyes and also blue marking on the abdomen. A. affinis lacks the yellow T-shaped mark which is found on the top of the second abdomen segment in  A. mixta. The markings on the side of the thorax are also different in A. affinis and A. mixta. In A. affinis the sides of the thorax are greeny yellow with fine black lines along the sutures. In A. mixta the sides of the thorax are similar in colour but the yellow is separated by dark brown areas so it gives the appearance of having two broad yellow stripes

Distribution and habitat
Aeshna affinis is found in southern and central Europe and all around the Mediterranean, in North Africa and the Middle East and across Asia to China. It is found on many Mediterranean islands including Menorca, Corsica, and Sicily. Where it occurs with A. mixta, which has a more  northerly distribution, it is less common. It is a migrant species and so is found further northwards in good years.

Behaviour

Adults emerge in May and are on the wing until September. After emergence the immature adults move away from water and spend a time feeding and becoming sexually mature. This period will last 10 days to many weeks. Males are often seen patrolling low down whereas A. mixta tends to patrol higher up in the trees.  After maturation the males patrol well vegetated ponds and lakes looking for females. The female will be grabbed and the pair will copulate. After sperm is transferred the male A. affinis stays with the female for egg laying which is usually in vegetation. A. affinis is the only European Aeshna to lay its eggs in tandem; the only other European hawker to lay eggs in tandem is Anax parthenope. The larval stage usually lasts two years.

References

 Askew, R.R. (2004) The Dragonflies of Europe. (revised ed.) Harley Books. 
 d'Aguilar, J., Dommanget, JL., and Prechac, R. (1986) A field guide to the Dragonflies of Britain, Europe and North Africa. Collins. pp336. 
 Boudot JP., et al.. (2009) Atlas of the Odonata of the Mediterranean and North Africa. Libellula Supplement 9:1-256.
 Dijkstra, K-D.B & Lewington, R. (2006) Field Guide to the Dragonflies of Britain and Europe. British Wildlife Publishing. .
 Utzeri, C., and Raffi, R. (1983). Observations on the behaviour of Aeshna affinis (Vander Linden) at a dried-up pond (Anisoptera:Aeshnidae). Odonatologica 12:259-278.

External links
 Photographs of European dragonflies and damselflies
 
 

Aeshnidae
Insects described in 1820
Odonata of Africa
Odonata of Asia
Odonata of Europe
Taxa named by Pierre Léonard Vander Linden